Dichelopa sabulosa is a species of moth of the family Tortricidae. It is found in Australia, where it has been recorded from New South Wales and Queensland.

The wingspan is 10.5 mm for males and 12 mm for females.

References

Moths described in 1910
Dichelopa